is a peninsula in southern Aichi Prefecture, central Honshū, Japan.

Geography
It faces the Chita Peninsula, to the northwest, across the entrance to Mikawa Bay. Its total area is approximately 200 square kilometers.

Atsumi Peninsula is noted for its temperate climate, due to the warm Kuroshio Current offshore. The rock formations at Cape Irago, its western tip, and its beaches are part of the Mikawa Wan Quasi-National Park. Administratively, almost all of the peninsula falls within the city of Tahara, with its eastern "neck" within the city of Toyohashi.

History
Archaeological excavation of the Yoshigo Shell Midden and  sites has provided evidence for human habitation of Atsumi Peninsula during the Jomon Period. During Japan's feudal period, Atsumi Peninsula was the majority of land under the Tahara Domain. After the fall of the Tokugawa shogunate during the Meiji period, the peninsula became the heart of Atsumi District, with over 30 autonomous towns and villages. From the late 19th to the mid-20th century, most towns merged with neighbors or were consolidated by the government, until there were only two towns left: Atsumi in the west, which included Cape Irago, and the city of Tahara, to the east, which had the only railroad on the peninsula and shared a border with the larger city of Toyohashi.  In 2005, was absorbed into the city of Tahara, which now occupies the majority of the peninsula, with a small portion of the eastern end within the borders of Toyohashi.

References

Japan:An Illustrated Encyclopedia. Kodansha (1993) 

Peninsulas of Japan
Tourist attractions in Aichi Prefecture
Landforms of Aichi Prefecture